Paul Kornfeld (born 1987) is an American college swimming champion who, while attending Stanford University, won the 2008 NCAA Swimming and Diving Championship in the 100 yard  and the 200 yard breaststroke.

Born in Houston, he has also been named the Pacific-10 Conference swimmer of the year.

See also
World record progression 4 × 100 metres medley relay

References

External links
Paul Kornfeld statistics at GoStanford.com, the Official Website for the Stanford Cardinal

American male swimmers
Living people
1987 births
Sportspeople from Houston
Stanford Cardinal men's swimmers
World record setters in swimming